Seismic Seconds is a documentary television series that aired in the late 1990s on the National Geographic Channel. The program analysed the causes of six incidents, five involving the loss of human life. The better-known sequel to Seismic Seconds, Seconds From Disaster, was spun off from the series.

In the British version, the narrator says in the voiceover:

The beginning of this voiceover:  was later used and modified for the series Seconds From Disaster:

Episodes

See also
Blueprint for Disaster
Seconds from Disaster
Situation Critical
Mayday/Air Crash Investigation
Trapped

References

National Geographic (American TV channel) original programming
1990s American documentary television series
Documentary films about disasters